is a novel by Manabu Kaminaga published in Nihon Bungeisha with illustrations by Katoh Akatsuki and later in Kadokawa Bunko with cover illustrations by Yasushi Suzuki. The book has been adapted into two manga series, a live-action drama series and a stage play.

Episode list

References

Lists of anime episodes